A pegleg is a prosthesis, or artificial limb, fitted to the remaining stump of a human leg. Its use dates to antiquity.

History
By the late 19th century, prosthetics vendors would offer peglegs as cheaper alternatives to more intricate, lifelike artificial legs.
Even as vendors  touted advantages of more complicated prostheses over simple peglegs,
according to a contemporary surgeon, many patients found a pegleg more comfortable for walking. According to  medical reports, some amputees were able to adjust to the use of a pegleg so well that they could walk 10, or even 30, miles in one day.

Nowadays, wooden peglegs have been replaced by more modern materials, though some sports prostheses do have the same form.

Notable pegleg wearers

 François Leclerc (~1554), privateer
 Cornelis Jol, (1597–1641), privateer and Dutch West India Company admiral
 Peter Stuyvesant (1612–1672), Dutch Director-General of New Amsterdam
 Blas de Lezo (1687–1741), Spanish admiral
 Gouverneur Morris (1752–1816), American politician
 Brook Watson (1735 -1807), Lord Mayor of London 
 Pierre Daumesnil (1776 – 1832), French general
 Józef Sowiński (1777–1831), Polish General
 Billy Waters (1778–1823), aka Black Billy, former African American slave, then sailor in the British Navy until he became an amputee. Also a busker of prolific merit.
 Vuk Karadžić (1787–1864), Serbian linguist
 Thomas L. Smith (1801–1866), American mountain man
 Albert Chmielowski (1845–1916), Polish artist, founder of the Albertine Brothers and Sisters, saint of the Catholic Church
 Robert McAlpin Williamson (1804?–1859), nicknamed "Three-legged Willie", Republic of Texas Supreme Court Justice, state lawmaker, and Texas Ranger
 Kushibiki Yumindo (1859?-1924), Japanese impresario
 Peg Leg Bates (1907–1998), dancer
 Peg Leg Sam (Arthur Jackson) (1911–1977) American blues musician
 Joe "Pegleg" Morgan (1929–1993), first non-Hispanic member of the Mexican Mafia, an American criminal organization

References

Further reading

Books
 Murdoch, George and Wilson, A. Bennett (1998) A primer on amputations and artificial limbs C. Thomas, Springfield, Illinois, 
 Pitkin, Mark R. (2009) Biomechanics of Lower Limb Prosthetics Springer verlag, New York, 
 Seymour, Ron (2002) Prosthetics and orthotics: lower limb and spinal Lippincott Williams & Wilkins, Philadelphia, Pennsylvania, 
 Warren, D. W. (2001) James Gillingham: surgical mechanist & manufacturer of artificial limbs  Somerset Industrial Archaeology Society, Taunton, England,

Articles
 
 Cantos, Mae (2005) "Pirates & Peg Legs: a Historical Look at Amputation and Prosthetics" In: Whitelaw, William A. (2005) (editor) Proceedings of the 14h Annual History of Medicine Days Faculty of Medicine, University of Calgary, Calgary, Alberta, pp. 16–20, 
 
 
 Reeves, Nicholas (1999) "New lights on ancient Egyptian prosthetic medicine" In: Davies, W. V. (editor) (1999) Studies in Egyptian Antiquities. A Tribute to T.G.H. James British Museum Press, London, pp. 73–77, 
 
 Wilson, Philip D. (1922) "Early weight-bearing in the treatment of amputations of the lower limbs" The Journal of Bone and Joint Surgery 4: pp. 224–247

Medical equipment
Foot